The Norway men's national junior ice hockey team is the national junior ice hockey team in Norway. The team represents Norway at the International Ice Hockey Federation's IIHF World U20 Championships. The team also occasionally participates in international friendly tournaments under the names Norway B or Norway U25.

In 1979, Norway made their first appearance at the Pool A level in Karlstad, Sweden. Norway scored 2 goals. Norway did not return to Pool A until 1983, staying until 1991. Norway would have to wait 15 years to make it to the top level. In the 2006 World Junior Hockey Championships in Vancouver, Norway lost 11–2 to the United States and 4–0 in a hard-fought game to Canada. A brawl nearly started toward the end of the game with Canada.

World Junior Championship record

† Includes one win in extra time (in the preliminary round)
^ Includes one loss in extra time (in the preliminary round)
* Includes one win in extra time (in the playoff round)
+ Includes one loss in extra time (in the playoff round)
# Includes two wins in extra time

Jun
Junior national ice hockey teams